Institute of Corporate Directors (ICD) is primarily an institute of, for and by corporate directors established in the Philippines. It is made up mainly of individuals and reputational agents committed to the professional practice of corporate directorship in line with global principles of modern corporate governance.

About ICD

It is a non-stock, not-for-profit organization working in close partnership with other business, government and civil society organizations. As an independent and autonomous institute, it is open to working with others in the pursuit of systemic corporate governance reforms by networking with various institutes all over East Asia to enrich Director Education and share best practices in corporate governance.

ICD certifies those who have qualified as Fellows of the Institute. It caters to the continuing professional needs of its Fellows by setting standards for the professional practice of corporate directorship. It conducts advocacy programs designed to foster good governance and responsible citizenship.

ICD is active in conducting research and developing training materials for corporate directors and other professionals committed to the practice of modern corporate governance.  It offers training programs that promote the knowledge, skills, and values demanded by modern corporate governance. Thus, ICD regularly conducts the Corporate Governance Orientation Course (CGOP) as well as other programs on related subjects. Its flagship program is the Professional Directors Program (PDP), which is the first step towards becoming a Fellow of the Institute.

As an added service, ICD assists in the formulation and implementation of corporate governance improvement programs among organizations by facilitating institutional Governance Retreats for boards. ICD also assists in the formulation and implementation of corporate governance improvement programs in specific boards where its members serve. This includes the creation of Board and Director Performance Evaluation Systems, Continuing Education Programs, and the like.

Another of ICD's important contributions is the development of the annual Corporate Governance Scorecards.

ICD is a major player in Philippine corporate governance reform initiatives working closely with the Organisation for Economic Co-operation and Development, The Global Corporate Governance Forum, and International Corporate Governance Network on improving actual boardroom practices: moving away from principles into actual practices.

It works closely with key regulators with direct immediate interest in corporate governance: Bangko Sentral ng Pilipinas, Securities and Exchange Commission and the Insurance Commission.

It is a founding member of the Institutes of Directors in East Asia Network (IDEA.Net).

Corporate Governance Scorecard Project

ICD proposed the Corporate Governance Scorecard Project (CG-Sc) as an East Asian regional initiative to:
 promote transparency and accountability, and the general practice of Good Corporate Governance, and
 provide a standard method for measurement, ranking and progress tracking of Corporate Governance practices.

Through the Institutes of Directors in East Asia (IDEA.net) and with the Thai Institute of Directors (IoD) volunteering to take charge of moving the initiative forward, five East Asian economies - namely Thailand, China, Hong Kong, Indonesia, and the Philippines  - adopted this project.

Since 2005, the CG Scorecard created by ICD has been uniquely tailored in order to incorporate specific needs of the Philippines’ local corporate setting. In doing so, the ICD and its fellow proponents hope to promote corporate governance awareness in various business sectors.

The Center for International Private Enterprise (CIPE) in Washington, D.C., a private organization which promotes market-enterprise among developing nations through business reforms is instrumental in the funding of this project.

Training programs

Corporate Governance Orientation Program (CGOP)

The Institute of Corporate Directors offers a one-day Orientation Course once every quarter. A preparatory course for the Professional Directors Program (PDP), the discussions and structured learning in this one-day interactive program will examine the responsibilities of directors and the collective role of the board, and explore pointers for performance as practical tools to make the board work more effectively. Designed to familiarize directors and top management with Corporate Governance in the Philippine setting, this course focuses on: the principles of Good Governance, Best Practices, and Finance. An additional half-day session on Audit, Risk, and Governance Committees is made available especially for individuals in the banking or financial sector. Exclusive runs are also conducted for companies that require more customized sessions.

Professional Directors Program (PDP)

The PDP is an intensive 5-day course which includes an orientation course (the Corporate Governance Orientation Program (CGOP)), plus whole day, interactive sessions on: Strategy, Policy, Monitoring, and Accountability. This program, which seeks to provide a deeper appreciation of the demands of professional directorship, is offered once every quarter. ICD accredits corporate directors committed to enhancing the long-term value of the corporation they serve through the observance of corporate governance principles, ethics and social responsibility. The PDP is the first step towards becoming a Fellow of the Institute.

Board Retreat

For Boards who seek to systematically plot their course towards the fourth phase of the PGS (Institutionalization), this 2-3 day working session is aimed at "roadmapping" and developing clear action programs that are geared towards bringing the corporation’s governance system to international standards. This completes the first phase (Initiation) and helps the company to transition to the second phase of the Performance Governance System (Compliance.)

Specialized Modules and Working Sessions

Specialized courses on Audit Committees, Risk Management Committees, Governance Committees, Corporate Secretaries, Compliance Officers, Financial Numeracy for Directors, and the like are offered. Customized courses on governance and professional directorship are likewise available for individuals, corporations, organizations and groups.

Services

Performance Evaluation System

The ICD provides advice and technical assistance in the development and implementation of Performance Evaluation Systems, mainly for the Board and its committees, tailored to the needs and specifications of the client.

CG Scorecard Result Presentations

The Corporate Governance Scorecard Project provides a standard against which companies can measure their practices. Board presentations allow the directors to see which particular areas need improvement and how best to implement the appropriate reforms. The ICD has also launched two related programs: Raising the Scores and Broadening Participation. These support ICD’s goal of increasing the number of participating companies as well as helping companies improve their practices and as a corollary, improve their scores.

Board Advisory and Consultation

The ICD may also serve as advisor or consultant for various purposes or issues related to corporate governance.

Other activities

The ICD regularly conducts:
Monthly Roundtables
ICD Annual Dinner
ICD Annual Working Session
Investors' Forums
CG Scorecard (measuring CG practices of publicly listed companies, state-owned enterprises (or government-owned and -controlled companies), family-owned and -controlled companies, banks, and the insurance sector.

References
http://www.zenithbank.com/ZEQ_Vol%206.pdf
http://www.cipe.org/programs/global/partners/dispPartner.php?id=55
http://www.finex.org.ph/members/download/publication/article/mb09/july/GOLD%20AND%20SILVER%20SCORERS%20-%20July%202,%202009.doc
http://www.bworldonline.com/BW060309/content.php?id=142
http://www.iro.ph/downloads/pressrelease/050703-pressr.pdf
http://www.oecd.org/document/20/0,3343,en_2649_34813_42263124_1_1_1_1,00.html
http://www.kpmg.com.ph/corneraud20080812.asp
https://web.archive.org/web/20070912161849/http://www.directoreducation.com.au/html/projects/projects.htm

External links
http://www.icdcenter.org/

Business and finance professional associations
Institute of Directors
Professional associations based in the Philippines
Organizations based in Metro Manila